Bø is a village in Sortland Municipality in Nordland county, Norway.

References

Sortland
Villages in Nordland
Populated places of Arctic Norway